Porter Ridge High School is a public high school in Indian Trail, North Carolina. Opened in 2005, it is the largest high school in the Union County Public Schools School System.  Located in the northwestern portion of Union County, it has experienced considerable growth in the last two decades.  The school serves half of Indian Trail (shared with Sun Valley High School) and all of Hemby Bridge and Stallings. The school is next to the campuses of Porter Ridge Middle School and Porter Ridge Elementary School. The school's mascot is a pirate, and the school colors are purple, black, and silver. The Soccer, Football, Lacrosse, and Track teams compete at Bonterra Stadium.

Athletics
In 2012, the softball team won the 4A State Championship over Holly Springs High School. They finished the season as the number one overall softball team in North Carolina, and number two nationally according to the final 2012 FloSoftball FAB 50 high school rankings.

The Band of Pirates 
The Porter Ridge Band of Pirates, the school's marching band, has a storied and accomplished history. Beyond attaining competition accolades, the band has been invited to perform at events across the country; most notably on the USS Missouri during the 2015 commemoration of the Attack on Pearl Harbor in Honolulu, HI.

Location
Porter Ridge Elementary, Middle, and High were all built on land donated by the Porter family. This, in conjunction with the campus' proximity to Ridge Road, gave the school its name.

The school's campus is on the South Fork of Crooked Creek, and is situated across from an environmentally protected area that is home to a rare mollusk, the Carolina heelsplitter. Weddington High School was the prototype for the school's design.

Controversy 
In 2021, former science teacher Alexander Dewsbury was criminally charged with, among other counts, indecent liberties with a student.

Notable alumni
Lexi Davis (c/o 2012), former softball player and college softball coach
Grayson McCall (c/o 2019), American football Quarterback for Coastal Carolina

References

External links 
Porter Ridge High School

Public high schools in North Carolina
Schools in Union County, North Carolina